is a former Japanese football player.

Playing career
Tsutsui was born in Yokohama on August 15, 1976. He joined his local club Yokohama Marinos from youth team in 1995. However he could not play at all in the match until 1996. In 1997, he moved to Japan Football League club Otsuka Pharmaceutical (later Tokushima Vortis). He played as regular player in 2 seasons. In 1999, he moved to newly was promoted to J2 League club, Albirex Niigata. He played many matches as defensive midfielder. In 2000, he moved to Otsuka Pharmaceutical again and he played as regular player. The club won the champions for 2 years in a row (2003-2004) and was promoted to J2 from 2005. Although he played many matches in 2005, he could hardly play in the match from 2006 and retired end of 2007 season.

Club statistics

References

External links

Tokushima Vortis

1976 births
Living people
Association football people from Kanagawa Prefecture
Japanese footballers
J1 League players
J2 League players
Japan Football League (1992–1998) players
Japan Football League players
Yokohama F. Marinos players
Tokushima Vortis players
Albirex Niigata players
Association football midfielders